The Pierre Berton Show was a television show on CHCH TV, hosted by Pierre Berton. It ran from 1962 to 1973, and Berton regularly interviewed important artists, actors, and other public figures. His interviewees included Malcolm X in 1965, Lenny Bruce in 1966, and the only known interview with Bruce Lee in 1971.

References

External links
 The Malcolm X Interview transcript 1965
 Bruce Lee Interview 1971 video

1960s Canadian television talk shows
1962 Canadian television series debuts
1973 Canadian television series endings
Pierre Berton
Television series by Sony Pictures Television
1970s Canadian television talk shows